Njan Marykutty is a 2018 Indian Malayalam-language drama film written and directed by Ranjith Sankar and co-produced with Jayasurya. The film stars Jayasurya as a trans woman named Marykutty, with Innocent, Jewel Mary, Jins Baskar, Suraj Venjaramoodu, Aju Varghese and Joju George in other prominent roles. The music for the film was composed by Anand Madhusoodhanan. The film was released on 15 June 2018 on the eve of Eid.

Theme 
A transgender woman's attempt to realize her true orientation in a society that stigmatizes gender transformation. Will Marykutty come out victorious while shredding all the taboos associated with transgenders and the stigma of surgery?

The film attempted to educate audience on various issues faced by transgenders and also the plot of the film explains the difference between transgender and those who have gone through surgery to align with their gender. In doing so, the film showcased the trauma that families go through, as well as the emotional and physical trauma that members of this community undergo, at the hands of society and governmental authorities.

Synopsis
Mathukutty, is transsexual who wants to undergo surgery to align her preferred gender to her body. Born a male, she becomes Marykutty and her problems start when she comes back to her native place. Though her family disowns Marykutty, it is the parish priest, who gives her all the confidence. She is determined to become a sub Inspector and joins a coaching institute to prepare for the exam. In between, she earns considerable appreciation in that area, as a Radio Jockey in the FM channel run by the church.

The film narrates the hardwork and hardships faced by Marykutty to achieve her dream and to set a respectable identity in the society.

Cast 
 Jayasurya as Marykutty/ Mathukutty/RJ Angel
  Adwaith Jayasurya  as young Mathukutty
 Jewel Mary
 Aju Varghese as RJ Alwin Henry 
 Jins Baskar as Sabu 
 Suraj Venjaramoodu as Collector 
 Joju George as S.I Kunjippalu
 Innocent as Chacko, the local priest
 V. K. Baiju
 Shivaji Guruvayoor as Charles, Marykutty's father
 Shobha Mohan as Alice, Marykutty's mother
 Malavika Menon as Annie

Production 
Jayasurya agreed to collaborate with film director Ranjith Sankar in March 2018, for the project titled Njan Marykutty. This film marks their fifth collaboration. Filming began in Muvattupuzha on 17 March 2018.

According to an interview given by the team, originally they thought of making a comedy film. As other trans movies with comedy, or sympathy theme already exist, later the plan was changed to create a movie with a positive message. Hence the character is someone who succeeded in life against all the odds. Also to avoid common pattern of long hair for trans characters in many movies, short hair was chosen in this movie. Additionally makeup man Ronex Xavier used less makeup for Jayasurya's character, and certain shot were taken without any makeup at all. As preparation for movie Jayasurya pierced his ear, dieted to put on weight, and stopped his normal daily workout programs. Jayasurya also learnt to drape a saree within 4 minutes for the shooting of the film.
 
Jayasurya revealed that his role as a transgender person was the most difficult character that he ever played in his career and also revealed that he wanted to play the character of a transgender person to change the aspects and mindsets of the society that it generally thinks upon the transgender people. The costume designs for the film were designed by Jayasurya's wife Saritha and the trans woman getup of Jayasurya was used by his wife Saritha to display as the model for the promotion of Saritha's costume design boutique. Ranjith later revealed that he was inspired by transsexual actress Anjali Ameer to make a transgender related film.

Release 
The film had its theatrical release on 15 June 2018 in Kerala and a week later in rest of India. It was released in the Middle East on 5 July 2018. The posters of the film displayed in the United Arab Emirates screenings featured a faceless Jayasurya as the UAE government prohibits sex assignment surgery in the country. The film was also tagged adult only and no promotions of the film were allowed in the country. According to Sankar, there were other restrictions as well.

Reception 
The Times of India rated the film 3 out of 5 stars and lauded the performance of Jayasurya for his role as a transgender person in the film stating that this is a fine effort to portray the respect and dignity of transgender people through the versatile acting of Jayasurya. The Hindu newspaper gave positive reviews to the film for handling the troubles and challenges of a transperson with sensitivity.

Deccan Chronicle rated 4 out of 5 stars and said "Njan Marykutty stands out for the fine way the lead character Marykutty has been scripted by director Ranjith Sankar and interpreted by actor Jayasurya". International Business Times wrote "for the first time in the history of Mollywood, a transgender character has been portrayed with dignity and respect". Although he said there are some unrealistic moment it is forgettable for Sankar's good intention.

Baradwaj Rangan of Film Companion South wrote "A finely tuned Jayasurya performance carries a black-and-white tale of a transgender who wants to become a cop "

Accolades
 2019: Kerala State Film Award for Best Actor – Jayasurya
2019: Kerala State Film Award for Best Makeup Artist - Ronex Xavior

Music
Anand Madhusoodhanan composed the music, who collaborated with Jayasurya and Sankar for the third time. Lyrics were written by Santhosh Varma.

 Doore Doore - Biju Narayanan
 Cherupulliyuduppitta Poompaatta - Nidhin P. K.
 Ennullil Ennum Nee Maathram - Sithara Krishnakumar
 Kaanaa Kadalaasilaaro - Sithara Krishnakumar
 Oru Kochu Kumbilaanennaakilum - Nidhin P. K.
 Penninullil Priya Mohangalkku - Nithin P. K.
 Thirakalethire Vannalum - Vineeth Sreenivasan
 Uyaraan Padaraan - Nidhin P. K

References

External links 
 

2018 LGBT-related films
2010s Malayalam-language films
Indian drama films
Indian LGBT-related films
LGBT-related comedy films
Films about trans women
Films directed by Ranjith Sankar
Transgender-related films